The 2019 OEC Kaohsiung-Singles was a men's tennis tournament held from September 16 to September 22, 2019, at Kaohsiung, Taiwan. Gaël Monfils was the defending champion but chose not to defend his title.

John Millman won the title after defeating Marc Polmans 6–4, 6–2 in the final.

Seeds
All seeds receive a bye into the second round.

Draw

Finals

Top half

Section 1

Section 2

Bottom half

Section 3

Section 4

References

Main draw
Qualifying draw

2019 ATP Challenger Tour
2019 Singles